Hakea myrtoides, commonly known as myrtle hakea, is a  shrub endemic to the woodlands of the Darling Range near Perth in  Western Australia.

Description
In cultivation the plant in often grafted onto Hakea salicifolia, which enables it to grow in a wider variety of soil conditions.

Taxonomy and naming
This species was first formally described by Johann Georg Christian Lehmann in 1845 and the description was published in Plantae Preissianae. It is named from the genus Myrtus - myrtle and from the Greek oides - similar to, referring to leaf shape.

Distribution and habitat
A restricted species growing near Perth with intermittent occurrences north to Victoria Plains, it grows in lateritic sandy clay, granite outcrops and wandoo woodlands. It is an ornamental garden plant good for rockeries and as a ground cover in a well-drained, open, sunny site.

Conservation status
Hakea myrtoides is classified as "not threatened" by the Western Australian Government  Department of Parks and Wildlife.

References

myrtoides
Eudicots of Western Australia
Plants described in 1845
Taxa named by Carl Meissner